Ren Xuecheng (born 21 May 1985) is a Chinese freestyle wrestler. She won one gold and two silver medals at the World Wrestling Championships in the years 2005, 2006 and 2007. She also won the gold medal in the women's 48 kg event at the 2005 Asian Wrestling Championships and the silver medal in that event at the 2008 Asian Wrestling Championships.

References

External links 
 

Living people
1985 births
Place of birth missing (living people)
Chinese female sport wrestlers
World Wrestling Championships medalists
World Wrestling Champions
21st-century Chinese women